Fürigenbahn was a funicular railway above Lake Lucerne at Stansstad, Nidwalden, Switzerland. The line led from the bath in Harissenbucht, a bay of Lake Lucerne, at 437 m to the Hotel Fürigen at 639 m. The track had a length of 375 m with a difference of elevation of 202 m and a maximum incline of 73%. The hotel built it for clients' use in spring 1924, but opened it to the public in 1927, after the Swiss Federal Assembly granted a concession for 80 years. 

The funicular ceased operations in October 2005, the concession expired in March 2007, and the hotel closed in 2010.

An association founded in 2020, Interessengemeinschaft Erhalt Fürigen Bahn (IG-EFB) seeks to revive the line.

Further reading

References  

de:Fürigenbahn

Furigen
800 mm gauge railways in Switzerland
Railway lines opened in 1924
Railway lines closed in 2005
Transport in Nidwalden